The Simpsons: Road Rage is a 2001 video game based on the animated television series The Simpsons, and is part of a series of games based on the show. It was released for PlayStation 2, Xbox and GameCube. A Game Boy Advance version was released in 2003. The Simpsons: Road Rage was later added to the Backwards Compatibility program of the Xbox 360 for original Xbox games.

The game stars Homer, Marge, Bart, and Lisa, as well as Mr. Burns and several other characters from the show. The Simpsons: Road Rage is similar to Sega's 1999 video game Crazy Taxi, in that the main objective is to drive picked up passengers to their destinations as quickly as possible. These similarities led to Sega suing Radical Entertainment and Electronic Arts for patent infringement, though it was settled before going to court. The game received mixed reviews, being considered a bare-bones Crazy Taxi clone and criticised for its poor graphics. A spiritual successor, The Simpsons: Hit & Run, was released in 2003 and developed by Radical Entertainment.

Gameplay and plot
The Simpsons: Road Rage is based on the animated television series The Simpsons. In the story of the game, Mr. Burns has bought all transit systems in Springfield and has begun to create radioactive buses that threaten the public health. Because of this, the citizens of Springfield must use their own cars as a means of safer public transport and earn money in an attempt to pay back Burns to get rid of the radioactive buses and return the town back to normal.

The citizens of the city (controlled by the game player) earn money by driving around a vehicle for a given amount of time, picking up passengers and taking them to their destinations. The player receives money upon successfully dropping off each passenger, and bonuses are obtained when they are transported in a short amount of time. Players have to avoid certain hurdles, such as other vehicles and Burns' nuclear transit buses. The game contains sixteen different collectible vehicles, six starting locations, and ten different missions. In order to collect the vehicles and unlock starting locations, players must earn progressively more money for each vehicle or starting location they want to get. In order to complete missions, players must do certain things (such as protecting Krusty the Clown from a fan mob by driving him away, and getting Homer to his workplace unnoticed).

At first, the only playable characters (taxi drivers) are Homer, Marge, Bart, Lisa, and Grampa, but as the game progresses more characters are unlocked. There is also a multiplayer mode in which the two players compete to pick up the same passengers and drive them to their destinations.

Development and release
The Simpsons: Road Rage was developed by Radical Entertainment and published by Electronic Arts. The PlayStation 2 version was released first, on November 19, 2001 in North America, and the Xbox and GameCube versions followed in December of that year. The cast members of The Simpsons provided their voices for the game. Voice samples original to the game, as well as one-liners from the show, can be heard in Road Rage.

A version for the Game Boy Advance (GBA), developed by Altron and published by THQ, was released in North America on July 3, 2003. THQ reached a publishing agreement with Fox Interactive in 2002 that gave them the rights to publish this version and a Buffy the Vampire Slayer game. Germaine Gioia, vice president of licensing at THQ, said "The Simpsons and Buffy properties have enjoyed tremendous consumer appeal in nearly every product category, including video game successes. Both properties will serve to further bolster our leadership position on the Game Boy Advance."

Reception

The game received "mixed or average reviews" on all platforms according to the review aggregation website Metacritic.

Amer Ajami of GameSpot said that the PlayStation 2 version "suffers from a number of problems, not the least of which is bad collision detection. You'll often find yourself clipping a corner of a building or slamming into another car even though you have room to spare." Ajami was also disappointed with the extremely slippery and overly sensitive control. Ajami added, however, that fans of the show should enjoy the game.

IGNs David Zdyrko said of the same console version that "the gameplay just isn't deep or compelling enough to warrant picking this title up unless you absolutely MUST have every single product with The Simpsons plastered on it." Zdyrko also criticized the graphics, stating that the "framerate chugs in some of the levels when there are a lot of cars on screen and the textures are generally low resolution and completely bland." Zdyrko also said the "hilarious voice samples" were the "lone bright spot" of the game, although he admitted that some of them can get a bit repetitive.

NextGen said of the Xbox version, "It's strange. Crazy Taxi is great, and The Simpsons is great, so the two together should be gaming magic, right? Yet the result is less than the sum of its parts. In the end, Road Rage is significant only as the most shameless incident of design burglary in recent memory."

By July 2006, the PlayStation 2 version had sold 1.6 million copies and earned $41 million in the U.S. NextGen ranked it as the 25th highest-selling game launched for the PlayStation 2, Xbox, or GameCube between January 2000 and July 2006 in that country. Combined sales of Simpsons console games released in the 2000s reached 5.2 million units in the United States by July 2006. The same console version also received a "Platinum" sales award from the Entertainment and Leisure Software Publishers Association (ELSPA), indicating sales of at least 300,000 copies in the U.K. The game has a total of at least 3 million copies sold.

Lawsuit
During 2003, Sega, creator and owner of the Crazy Taxi franchise, filed a lawsuit against Fox Interactive, Electronic Arts, and Radical Entertainment, claiming that Road Rage was a patent infringement of the former as both games feature nearly identical gameplay and objectives with the Crazy Taxi game engine. According to IGN, "Road Rage features similar game play, to the point where some reviews commented negatively on the parallels." The case, Sega of America, Inc. v. Fox Interactive, et al., was settled in private mediation for an undisclosed amount.

References

External links
 
 

2001 video games
Altron games
Electronic Arts games
Fox Interactive games
Game Boy Advance games
GameCube games
Multiplayer and single-player video games
PlayStation 2 games
Racing video games
Radical Entertainment games
THQ games
Road Rage
Video games developed in Canada
Video games developed in Japan
Video games involved in plagiarism controversies 
Video games set in the United States
Video games about taxis
Xbox games